Kimberly Alkemade (born 29 March 1990) is a Dutch Paralympic athlete.  She qualified to represent the Netherlands at the 2020 Summer Paralympics in Tokyo, Japan. At the 2020 Summer Paralympics, she won the bronze medal in the women's 200 metres T64 event. She finished in 5th place in the women's 100 metres T64 event.

Career 
Alkemade lost her left lower leg in a bus accident in 1998 near Montelimar, France, and started in Para athletics. The 2019 World Para Athletics Championships was her first big tournament.

She represented the Netherlands at the 2019 World Para Athletics Championships held in Dubai, United Arab Emirates and won a silver medal in the women's 200 metres T64 event and the bronze medal in the women's 100 metres T64 event.

References

External links 
 
Kimberly Alkemade | T64 Para-atleet op 100 & 200m sprint

1990 births
Living people
People from Zoetermeer
Dutch female sprinters
Paralympic athletes of the Netherlands
Medalists at the World Para Athletics Championships
Medalists at the World Para Athletics European Championships
Athletes (track and field) at the 2020 Summer Paralympics
Sportspeople from South Holland
21st-century Dutch women